Bermuda competed at the 1992 Summer Olympics in Barcelona, Spain.

Competitors
The following is the list of number of competitors in the Games.

Athletics

Men
Track & road events

Field events

Women
Track & road events

Equestrian

Dressage

Eventing

Sailing

Men

Women

Open

Swimming

Men

Women

See also
Bermuda at the 1991 Pan American Games

References

Official Olympic Reports

Nations at the 1992 Summer Olympics
Olympics
1992